Erick Rivera Guerrero (born 15 November 1992) is a Mexican footballer who plays as a midfielder for Cafetaleros de Tapachula.

References

External links
Erick Rivera at Soccerway

Mexican footballers
1992 births
Living people
Association football midfielders
Irapuato F.C. footballers
Cafetaleros de Chiapas footballers